Pseudosetia is a genus of minute sea snails, marine gastropod mollusks or micromollusks in the family Rissoidae.

Species
Species within the genus Pseudosetia include:

 Pseudosetia amydralox Bouchet & Warén, 1993
 Pseudosetia azorica Bouchet & Warén, 1993
 Pseudosetia ficaratiensis (Brugnone, 1876)
 Pseudosetia semipellucida (Friele, 1879)
 Pseudosetia turgida (Jeffreys, 1870)

References

Rissoidae